Renaissance School of Art and Reasoning is a public middle school located in Sammamish, King County, Washington, USA.  It is a choice school operating in the Lake Washington School District.  Renaissance, located on the campus of Eastlake High School, has an arts-based curriculum and a maximum enrollment of 96 students, 32 in each grade.  Renaissance accepts student applications from all grade schools in Lake Washington School District, but as there are currently many more applications than there are available spaces at the school, all incoming sixth grade students are chosen by random drawing.

History
Renaissance was founded in 2006 by teachers who wanted to create a supportive but challenging academic environment for junior high-age students.  The school held its first commencement for graduating ninth grade students in June 2009. However, in 2011, all schools in the Lake Washington School District decided that children would begin middle school/junior high in sixth grade, and graduate middle school/junior high in eighth grade.

Curriculum
The Renaissance curriculum is based strongly in the visual and performing arts.  The school's total enrollment is deliberately kept small.

See also
Charter school

References

Educational institutions established in 2006
Public middle schools in Washington (state)
Schools in Sammamish, Washington
2006 establishments in Washington (state)